The Ombudsman is an officer of the New Zealand Parliament to independently look into complaints. The core jurisdiction of the office is cases of maladministration, but it has been progressively expanded over the years to cover complaints under the Official Information Act 1982 and Local Government Official Information and Meetings Act 1987, whistleblower complaints under the Protected Disclosures Act 2000, and it is one of New Zealand's national preventive mechanisms under the Optional Protocol to the Convention against Torture.

Ombudsmen are appointed by the Governor-General of New Zealand on recommendation from the New Zealand House of Representatives for a term of five years. The current Chief Ombudsman is Peter Boshier.

History
The idea of establishing an ombudsman in New Zealand goes back to early 1961 when the Second National Government circulated a paper proposing to do so, based on the Scandinavian model. The idea was received with skepticism by the public service. In 1962 Parliament passed the Parliamentary Commissioner (Ombudsman) Act 1962, creating an ombudsmen system based on that of Denmark, with powers to investigate administrative decisions. Initially the Ombudsman served for a term of three years, and had jurisdiction only over central government agencies. In 1968 their jurisdiction was extended to include education boards and hospital boards. In 1975 the Act was replaced with the Ombudsmen Act 1975, which allowed for multiple Ombudsmen, each serving a term of five years. In 1982 the jurisdiction of the Ombudsmen was expanded again, to cover complaints under the Official Information Act 1982.

List of Chief Ombudsmen
The following is a list of New Zealand's Chief Ombudsmen:

References

External links
 

Officers of the Parliament of New Zealand
New Zealand
1962 establishments in New Zealand